Adrian Purtell (born 31 January 1985) is an Australian former professional rugby league footballer who plays for the Albury Thunder. 

He previously played for the Canberra Raiders, Penrith Panthers, Bradford Bulls and the London Broncos.

Career

Early career
Purtell played junior rugby league with Albury Rams and Lavington Panthers.

Canberra Raiders
He made his début for the Canberra Raiders in round 1 2006 against the Manly-Warringah Sea Eagles.  In 2006, he was crowned the club's Rookie of the Year. During the season, he also re-signed with the club until the end of 2008.

In round 6 of the 2007 NRL season, Purtell was shifted from the wing to the centres.  Purtell took this opportunity with both hands, scoring two tries in his first match in the new position and showing consistent form after that match.

Purtell was diagnosed with deep vein thrombosis in the middle of 2007. He missed the rest of the season as a result. This came at a cruel time for Purtell as he had only just cemented a spot in the centres. In his last game of 2007 he scored 3 tries against the St George Illawarra Dragons, including a 90-metre solo effort.

After a long recovery Purtell made a successful return to rugby league. On 16 March 2008, Purtell completed his return by crossing over for 2 tries against the Newcastle Knights. Soon after he re-signed to stay with Canberra until the end of the 2011 season, rejecting an offer to join the Melbourne Storm. He ended the 2008 NRL season as top try-scorer for the Raiders.

After being unable to maintain his position in the starting team for the second half of the 2009 season, Purtell was offered a release by Canberra.

Penrith Panthers
He joined the Penrith Panthers from the 2010 NRL season.  In his first year at the club, Penrith finished second on the table but were eliminated from the finals series after losing both matches consecutively.

The following year, Penrith finished a disappointing 12th on the table and missed out on the finals.

Bradford Bulls
It was announced that Purtell signed a 3-year contract with Super League team Bradford Bulls.

2012 - 2012 Season

Purtell featured in two of the four pre-season friendlies. He played against Dewsbury Rams and Hull FC, Adrian scored a try against the Rams.

Adrian featured in two consecutive games from Round 1 (Catalans Dragons) to Round 2 (Castleford Tigers). Purtell was injured for Rounds 3-6. He returned in Round 7 (St. Helens). He was ill for Round 8. He once again returned and featured in four consecutive games from Round 9 (Hull F.C.) to Round 12 (Huddersfield Giants). He was injured for Rounds 13-14. He returned to feature in Round 15 (Leeds Rhinos). Purtell also appeared in the Challenge Cup against Doncaster and Warrington Wolves. He scored against Widnes Vikings (1 try) and Warrington Wolves (1 try).

2013 - 2013 Season

Purtell missed the pre-season games against Dewsbury Rams and Leeds Rhinos due to the doctors not giving him permission to play until April.

Due to the doctors orders he missed Rounds 1-6. He made his comeback and played in ten consecutive games from Round 7 (Hull Kingston Rovers) to Round 16 (Huddersfield Giants) however he missed Rounds 17-18 due to injury but returned to play in Round 19 (Widnes Vikings) to Round 25 (Castleford Tigers). Purtell also featured in the Challenge Cup against Rochdale Hornets and London Broncos. He scored against Leeds Rhinos (1 try), Salford City Reds (2 tries), Warrington Wolves (1 try) and Catalans Dragons (1 try).

2014 - 2014 Season

Purtell featured in the pre-season games against Hull F.C. and Castleford Tigers. He scored against Hull F.C. (1 try).

He featured in Round 1 (Castleford Tigers) to Round 21 (Huddersfield Giants). Adrian also featured in Round 4 (Oldham R.L.F.C.) to the Quarter Final (Warrington Wolves) in the Challenge Cup. Purtell scored against Castleford Tigers (1 try), Wakefield Trinity Wildcats (3 tries), Hull F.C. (1 try), Salford Red Devils (1 try), Catalans Dragons (1 try), Warrington Wolves (3 tries) and St Helens R.F.C. (1 try).

He signed a new 1 Year Deal with Bradford despite their relegation from Super League.

2015 - 2015 Season

Purtell featured in the pre-season friendlies against Castleford Tigers and Leeds Rhinos. He scored against Castleford Tigers (1 try).

He featured in Round 1 (Leigh Centurions) to Round 4 (Hunslet Hawks) then in Round 6 (Workington Town) to Round 9 (London Broncos). Purtell also played in Round 11 (Sheffield Eagles) to Round 13 (Featherstone Rovers) then in Round 22 (Leigh Centurions). Purtell played in Qualifier 1 (Sheffield Eagles) to Qualifier 6 (Leigh Centurions). Adrian played in the £1 Million Game (Wakefield Trinity Wildcats). He also featured in the Challenge Cup in Round 4 (Workington Town). He scored against Whitehaven (3 tries), Featherstone Rovers (1 try), Workington Town (3 tries), Sheffield Eagles (1 try), Halifax (2 tries), Dewsbury Rams (2 tries), Wakefield Trinity Wildcats (2 tries), Salford Red Devils (1 try) and Widnes Vikings (1 try).

2016 - 2016 Season

After the retirement of Chev Walker it was announced that Purtell would be the captain of the Bulls. He did not feature in any of the friendlies due to a minor injury.

Purtell featured in Round 1 (Featherstone Rovers) to Round 4 (Leigh Centurions) then in Round 9 (Sheffield Eagles) to Round 11 (Workington Town). He played in the Championship Shield Game 2 (Halifax) then in the Final (Sheffield Eagles). He scored against Leigh Centurions (1 try), Workington Town (1 try), Halifax (1 try) and Sheffield Eagles (1 try).

London Broncos
2017 - 2017 Season

Purtell signed to play for London Broncos in the 2017 season.

Purtell featured in Round 1 (Swinton Lions) to Round 7 (Rochdale Hornets). He also featured in the Challenge Cup in Round 4 (Toronto Wolfpack). He scored against Hull Kingston Rovers (1 try) and Rochdale Hornets (1 try).

Albury Thunder
Adrian Purtell returned to his hometown to play Albury Thunder in Group 9 of the New South Wales Rugby League.

Statistics

Heart Attack
On 27 May 2012, Adrian Purtell suffered a heart attack. Club medical staff were aware of Purtell's chest pains, and stopped many times for treatment, as the Bulls returned from their 37–22 loss to Leeds Rhinos. He was cleared to resume playing in April 2013.

References

External links

London Broncos profile
NRL profile
Canberra Raiders profile

1985 births
Living people
Australian rugby league players
Australian expatriate sportspeople in England
Bradford Bulls captains
Bradford Bulls players
Canberra Raiders players
London Broncos players
Penrith Panthers players
Rugby league centres
Rugby league players from Albury, New South Wales
Rugby league wingers
Windsor Wolves players